Mexicali Rose (also known as The Girl from Mexico) is a 1929 American pre-Code romantic drama film directed by Erle C. Kenton, and starring Barbara Stanwyck and Sam Hardy. A silent and sound version are preserved at the Library of Congress.

Plot
"Happy" Manning returns early from a trip to his Mexican casino, the Mina de Oro (Gold Mine), and to his wife Rose, unaware she has been unfaithful to him with Joe, the croupier. Happy soon finds out and divorces Rose, but he keeps Joe, as Joe is too valuable an employee to lose. Afterward, he goes to visit his younger brother and ward, Bob, who is the quarterback of his college football team in California. Bob introduces him to his fiancée Marie. Bob, believing Happy owns a gold mine, promises to spend his honeymoon there. When Bob does get married, he sends Happy a telegram that he is coming. Happy's friend Ortiz offers to exchange his real gold mine for Happy's casino temporarily. Happy is shocked when Bob introduces his wife: Rose. Happy later tries to buy Rose off, but she turns him down, claiming she genuinely loves Bob. Happy is uncertain if she is lying or not and decides to not tell Bob the truth. However, it soon becomes clear that she has not changed. Happy blocks her secret late-night rendezvous with an admirer and confronts her. She claims that she loves Happy and that she married Bob to get back at him. She then tells him she is going home. The next day, she dies at the bottom of a cliff.

Cast

References

External links
 
 
 

1929 films
1929 romantic drama films
American black-and-white films
American romantic drama films
Columbia Pictures films
Films set in Mexico
Films about gambling
Films directed by Erle C. Kenton
1920s English-language films
1920s American films